The 2025 Rugby League World Cup will be the seventeenth staging of the Rugby League World Cup and will be held in France in October and November 2025

Additional competitions under the Festival of World Cups banner are planned to be held in France around men's centrepiece competition. Beyond the Rugby League World Cup, there will be several other separate World Cups under the tournament umbrella, including the women's, wheelchair and youth competitions. There will be 16 teams playing in the women's, youth (Under-19 men) and wheelchair umbrella competitions.

Cities and venues 
It was confirmed that the majority of games will be played in medium-sized cities, with finals matches to be played in cities such as Paris, Marseille, Lyon and Toulouse.

Qualified Teams 
Based on the 2021 World Cup, the following teams have already qualified for the 2025 edition. Qualifying rounds will take place to determine the additional teams to complete the format.

Mens Tournament:
  
  
  
  
  
  
  
  
(8/16)

Womens Tournament:
 
   
 
  Cook Islands 
 
  
  
 
(8/16)

References

External links
FESTIVAL OF WORLD CUPS ARCHIVES - ASIA PACIFIC RUGBY LEAGUE
French public warmly back hosting 2025 Rugby League World Cup, according to poll

 
2025 Rugby League World Cup